Georg Tamm (also Jüri Tamm; born 1867 Kavastu Parish, Tartu County) was an Estonian politician. He was a member of I Riigikogu. On 7 October 1921, he resigned his position and he was replaced by Johannes Koppel.

References

1867 births
Year of death missing
Members of the Riigikogu, 1920–1923